Taipei Main Station is the eastern terminus of the Taoyuan Airport MRT in Zhongzheng District, Taipei, Taiwan. It is the busiest station of the Taoyuan Airport MRT. The station is served by both express and commuter trains, and provides in-town check in services for outbound flights. Currently, four airlines offer this service.

Overview
This three-level, underground station has two island platforms with four tracks. It is equipped with eight accessible elevators and seven exits. It opened for trial service on 2 February 2017, and for commercial service 2 March 2017. It is located directly underneath the future Taipei Twin Towers.

Layout

Around the Station

 Taipei City Mall
 Taipei Travel Plaza
 Shin Kong Life Tower
 Taipei Twin Towers (future)
 National Taiwan Museum

See also
 Gate of Taipei
 Taipei Bus Station
 Taipei Main Station
 Beimen Station

References

2017 establishments in Taiwan
Railway stations opened in 2017
Taoyuan Airport MRT stations